Zembretta is an island located in the north-eastern Gulf of Tunis about  east of the island of Zembra. Its area is two hectares.

Islands of Tunisia